Steinhaus may refer to:

Bibiana Steinhaus, German football referee
 Edward Arthur Steinhaus (1914–1969), American insect pathologist
 Hugo Steinhaus, mathematician
 Steinhaus, Austria, a municipality in Upper Austria, Austria
 Steinhaus, Switzerland, a village in Ernen, Valais, Switzerland